Eero Koivumäki (20 June 1924 – 12 October 2013) was a Finnish rower. He competed in the men's double sculls event at the 1952 Summer Olympics.

References

External links
 

1924 births
2013 deaths
Finnish male rowers
Olympic rowers of Finland
Rowers at the 1952 Summer Olympics
People from Riihimäki
Sportspeople from Kanta-Häme